The Association of Accounting Technicians (AAT) is the world’s leading professional body for Accounting Technicians, with over 150,000 members worldwide. 

AAT has 150,000 members according to official records from the Financial Reporting Council (FRC). 

This includes 2,500 licensed bookkeepers. It also includes over 5,000 AAT Licensed Accountants who provide accountancy, tax and business advisory services to more than 500,000 individuals, sole traders and small and medium sized British businesses. 

80% of the FTSE 100 employ an AAT apprentice within their finance function.

AAT was created  in 1980 by the Institute of Accounting Staff (then a subsidiary of ACCA) and the Association of Technicians in Finance and Accounting (then a subsidiary of CIPFA). It is a technician level qualification offering higher apprenticeships which entitles those who have completed the exams and obtained relevant supervised work experience to become an accounting technician.  The AAT is based at 140 Aldersgate Street, London but has 43 branches across the UK with representation in the rest of the world including Hong Kong, Botswana and South Africa.

Professional recognition 
The body was sponsored by four UK chartered accountancy bodies; CIPFA, ICAEW, CIMA and ICAS from 1980 until May 2017. After this date, ICAEW, CIPFA, CIMA and ICAS no longer participated in AAT’s governance structure and AAT took the decision to bring their sponsoring body partnerships to a close.

A strong relationship remains between AAT and its former sponsoring bodies, albeit on a more operational basis, with exemptions for the chartered qualifications remaining at the heart of those relationships.

The AAT became a full member of the International Federation of Accountants (IFAC) in 2012.

Versus CAT 
Association of Chartered Certified Accountants (ACCA) used to be a sponsor of the AAT but broke away in order to form a rival qualification called the Certified Accounting Technician (CAT) award. The ACCA implemented this policy as it wanted a technician level qualification that offered accountancy apprenticeships based on the same business model as itself.

In Scotland 
The Institute of Chartered Accountants in Scotland is also keen to implement AAT courses into its own business model. It presently has no plans to develop an ICAS technician qualification in direct competition with the AAT's UK model as proposed in the late 1990s..

In South Africa 
The South African Institute of Chartered Accountants decided to sponsor the AAT program offering higher apprenticeship accounting courses and it has expanded since 2011. AAT(SA) has no signatory powers for any of its South African members, this is because there is not sufficient audit content within the qualification offered. SAICA and AAT are working towards gaining authority in a number of other areas, such as Commissioner of Oaths and review status. This sort of authority does take time to approve and the new South African Company Legislation is not yet finalised.

Examinations 
Since 2010 every level of the AAT qualification has a number of modules, each of which culminate in a computer based assessment.

Qualifications 
The AAT Intermediate Level 3 qualification or Level 6 in Scotland, is approved for the University entrance system with a value of 160 UCAS tariff points.  This is also included in the KS5 performance tables. The final AAT qualification, the AAT Advanced Level is equivalent to QCF Level 4 and SCQF Level 8.

Accounting Technicians, when certified as being experienced and competently qualified, can perform identical tasks to Chartered accountants with the exception of not being permitted to sign off company audits. This is largely irrelevant for AAT licensed accountants as their client base is almost exclusively formed of micro and small businesses who enjoy the small company audit exemption (employing less than 50 employees with a turnover below £10.1m or assets below £5.1m). 

AAT also licenses ATOL reporting accountants although it only has a small number of such members.

In 2014 AAT expanded its suite of qualifications and launched new courses in accounting, bookkeeping, computerised accounting, tax and business skills.

In 2017, AAT also launched a new membership category for bookkeepers (AATQB).

Employer accreditation
The AAT employer accreditation scheme recognises employers with a positive and planned approach to the professional development of their AAT members, whether through studying for an AAT qualification or, once qualified, supporting them in their continuing professional development.

AAT Accredited Employer Scheme provides the employer with a range of benefits including:

 Full and fellow members will automatically meet their mandatory CPD requirements by following their employer's training and development processes 
 Support in managing student member's 
 Advice on trainee recruitment and funding 
 AAT Accredited Employer logo and certificate.

Books of AATSee also
British Accountant

References

External links
AAT website
AAT's blog, AAT Comment
AAT Ethics site
AAT discussion forums

Accounting in the United Kingdom
Organisations based in the City of London
Professional accounting bodies
Accounting Technicians